The Parco Nazionale delle Foreste Casentinesi, Monte Falterona, Campigna is a national park in Italy.

It extends around the long ridge, descending steeply along the parallel valleys of the Romagna side and more gradually on the Tuscan side, which has gentler slopes, especially in the Casentino area, which slopes down gradually to the broad valley of the Arno.

On 7 July 2017, in Krakow, the UNESCO Commission included the Sasso Fratino Integral Nature Reserve and the Beech Forests included in the perimeter of the park, in the World Heritage List within the serial site Ancient and Primeval Beech Forests of the Carpathians and Other Regions of Europe

Main sights
Campigna - white fir
Acquacheta - waterfall, mentioned in Dante's Comedy
Badia Prataglia - beech wood
Camaldoli - monastery
Fiumicello - mill
Valbonella Botanical Gardens - botanical garden near Corniolo
Siemoni Arboretum - museum and historic arboretum located in Badia Prataglia
Tredozio- Tramazzo River Valley
Chiusi della Verna - Franciscan places
Castagno d'Andrea - chestnut wood
Ridracoli - lake and dam
Foresta della Lama - wildlife
Sasso Fratino - first integral nature reserve in Italy (1959)
Springs of Tiber River - Mount Fumaiolo
Springs of Arno River - Monte Falterona

Wildlife

A large part of the park is woodland. In the park there are areas the mountain vegetation, all types of woodland of the lower sub-mountain belt vegetation. In the forest dominated by hornbeams, turkey oaks and  sessile oaks, chestnut woods (especially in the Camaldoli area and at Castagno d’Andrea on the Florentine side). In rocky places there are some of the remaining rare cork oaks. 

Flora inside the park includes 48 tree and shrub species and over 1000 herbaceous species. The most valuable collection is to be found in the Mount Falco-Falterona massif.

Apennines wolf
Barn owl
Boar
Common buzzard
Eagle
Eurasian badger
Fallow deer
Marten
Red deer
Red fox
Roe deer
Tawny owl

References

External links
Official website 
Pages by the Park Authority on Parks.it

National parks of Italy
Apennine Mountains
Parks in Tuscany
Parks in Emilia-Romagna
Protected areas established in 1993
Protected areas of the Apennines
1993 establishments in Italy
Primeval Beech Forests in Europe